Yuan Xuefen (26 March 1922 – 19 February 2011) was a noted performer in the Yue opera genre of Chinese opera. She has been called "arguably the most important actress in the recent history of Yueju [Shaoxing] opera". The only other artist to be ranked with her is Fu Quanxiang.

Biography

Yuan is most known for playing the title role in the 1946 production of Sister Xianglin, an adaptation of a work by Lu Xun. Before beginning work on the adaptation of the work, she personally visited the home of Xu Guangping and Zhou Haiying, Lu Xun's wife and son, and asked their permission. According to Zhou, his mother quickly granted the request. Yuan is credited with leading the reform of Yue opera staging during the 1940s. Changes included the extensive use of lighting and scenery, and a new, soft style of costuming. In 1964, the film Two Stage Sisters, based on Yuan's life, was released. During the Cultural Revolution, Yuan was severely persecuted as a way of attacking Premier Zhou Enlai, who supported the film.

References

1922 births
2011 deaths
Actresses from Shaoxing
Yue opera actresses
People from Shengzhou
Victims of the Cultural Revolution
Musicians from Shaoxing
20th-century Chinese actresses